Cativé is a corregimiento in Soná District, Veraguas Province, Panama with a population of 822 as of 2010. Its population as of 1990 was 1,296; its population as of 2000 was 890.

References

Corregimientos of Veraguas Province